The European Polytechnical University (Bulgarian: Европейски политехнически университет), or EPU, is a private engineering university, located in Pernik, Bulgaria. The university was founded in 2010.

As a member of the Multiversity Association of Universities, EPU benefits from numerous advantages, such as access to comprehensive digital library collections. At the same time, direct access for students to the study platform and content is made possible via the Multiversity Network. The Multiversity network originates from the renowned and largest university for distance learning in Italy, the Pegaso Telematica University.

History 

The founders of the university are "Investec" Ltd, "Bulgarian Properties" OOD and the municipality of Pernik. It was opened by a decision of the National Assembly of the Republic of Bulgaria on 10 June 2010.

The first rector of the EPU is Prof. Dr. Sc.(Econ.) dtt. Hristo Hristov (former Dean and Vice-Rector of TUS and Deputy Minister). The following rectors of the University were Assacs Prof. Dr. Borislav Borisov (from D. A. Tsenov Academy of Economics, former Deputy Mayor of Varna) in December 2011, Prof. Dr.Sc.(Econ.) in September 2012 and Ivan Petkov (former Dean and Vice Rector of the University of Sofia) in December 2015. Since 2016, Prof. Dr. Marin Marinov (Associate Professor at TUS) has been elected Rector of EPU.

The first president (chairman of the board of trustees) is Dr Toshko Krastev. Later the position was filled by the Italian professor. Giuseppe Saccone (since 2016) and Dr Riccardo Romeo (currently).

In 2015, EPU became part of the higher education community of the Italian Pegaso Consortium and received accreditation by the German Institute for Accreditation, Certification and Quality Assurance (ACQUIN) - a member of the European Association for Quality Assurance in Higher Education (ENQA).

Programmes 
The university's academic profile for bachelor and master degrees lies in the modern subject areas of computer science and computer engineering, communication and computer networks and systems, architecture and urban planning, civil engineering and innovative entrepreneurship. The same curricula are taught in Bulgarian and English in all subjects and degrees. These are:

 Bachelor programmes
 Civil Engineering
 Applied Computer Science
 Green Energetics
 Master programmes
 Earthquake Engineering
 Renovation of Buildings, Facilities and Cultural Monuments
 Biofuels
 Hydrogen Technologies
 Solar Energetics
 Wind Energetics
 Personal Data Security
 Information Technology Management
 Information Security

The EPU is currently accredited for 4 years until 10 June 2024. The accreditation is granted by the National Agency for Assessment and Accreditation (NEAA) of the Council of Ministers of the Republic of Bulgaria. The NEAA is listed in the European Quality Assurance Register for Higher Education (EQAR) which is the official register for these agencies.

Internationality 
The university has a strong focus on internationalisation. The EPU carries out educational activities within the framework of joint programmes with other European universities, through projects or academic exchanges. Leading companies, firms and professional associations participate in the university's work and provide opportunities for successful implementation. EPU cooperates with universities from Europe, the USA and Asia. These include, among others:

 Germany
 RWTH Aachen
 SRH Hochschule Berlin
 Italy
 University of Catania
 Telematic University Pegaso 
 Ireland
 Ulster University
 Serbia
 University of Niš

The internationalisation strategy also includes the increasing number of academic staff from other European countries and the possibility to complete a programme online. It is expected that the programmes will be widely accepted by European students or by people who need to study part-time for further education while working. Compared to other European private universities, tuition fees are low, at 500 to 1,000 euros per semester, depending on the programme. As a multinational and multicultural educational centre, the university adheres to European values and ethical standards: a harmonious space of tolerance, empathy, respect and mutual understanding between students of different ethnicities, religions and cultures.

References

External links 
 
 Accreditation report by Accreditation, Certification and Quality Assurance Institute – ACQUIN
 Bachelor Studies in Europe: Bulgaria/European Polytechnical University
 Master Studies in Europe: Bulgaria/European Polytechnical University
  National Evaluation and Accreditation Agency in Bulgaria
 European Quality Assurance Register for Higher Education (EQAR)

Educational institutions established in 2010
Universities in Bulgaria
Pernik
2010 establishments in Bulgaria